The New Zealand Psychological Society (NZPsS) is one of the professional associations for psychologists in New Zealand. It is the largest professional body for psychologists in New Zealand, providing for both research psychologists and practicing psychologists.

History

The society began as a branch of the British Psychological Society in 1947, becoming an independent body in 1967. The society's first annual conference was held in 1968, when the society had approximately 150 members. Originally the society was dominated by academic psychologists, but by the 1960s and 1970s, practicing psychologists, primarily clinical psychologists, became a growing voice within the society. Between 1968 and 1978, the society grew to over 600 members.

In the 1970s, the society spoke out against unsafe driving practices, and submitted in support of changes to the Crimes Amendment Bill in 1974, the first parliamentary attempt at homosexual law reform in New Zealand. In 1978, Ann Ballin became the first woman president of the society.

The society was an integral lobbying force in passing the Psychologists Act 1981, which established psychology as a registered profession in New Zealand.

The society is a constituent organisation of Royal Society Te Apārangi.

Institutes and divisions

Within the society, a number of divisions exist to promote and foster specific fields of psychology. The Clinical Psychology Division was formed in the 1970s, followed by the Counselling Psychology Division in 1985 and the Community and Social Psychology Division was established in 1987. As of 2022, there are seven institutes and one special interest group:

Institute of Clinical Psychology
Institute of Community Psychology Aotearoa
Institute of Counselling Psychology
Institute of Criminal Justice and Forensic Psychology
Institute of Educational and Developmental Psychology
Institute of Health Psychology
Institute of Organisational Psychology
Special Interest Group (Coaching Psychology)

Registration

The society has a two-tier approach to membership and professional regulation: a general-scope registration, followed by a specialist scope registration, in a field such as clinical psychology or educational psychology.

Ethics

Members of the society are signatories to the Code of Ethics for Psychologists Working in Aotearoa/New Zealand, which was established in 2002 due to the Health Practitioners Competence Assurance Act 2003. Prior to the establishment of the code, each individual professional association for psychologists in New Zealand had their own code of ethics.

Presidents
The following have been Presidents of the Society.

Publications
New Zealand Journal of Psychology
Psychology Aotearoa

References

External links
 Official website

1947 establishments in New Zealand
Learned societies of New Zealand
Mental health organisations in New Zealand
Professional associations based in New Zealand
Psychological societies
Psychology-related professional associations
Psychology organisations based in New Zealand
Scientific organizations established in 1947